Chelonopsis is a genus of plants in the family Lamiaceae, first described in 1865. It is native to China, Japan, and the Western Himalayas.

Species
Chelonopsis abbreviata C.Y.Wu & H.W.Li - Yunnan
Chelonopsis bracteata W.W.Sm. - Yunnan
Chelonopsis cashmerica (Mukerjee) Hedge - Kashmir
Chelonopsis chekiangensis C.Y.Wu - Anhui, Guangdong, Jiangxi, Zhejiang
Chelonopsis deflexa (Benth.) Druce - southern China including Taiwan
Chelonopsis forrestii Anthony - Sichuan
Chelonopsis giraldii Diels - Gansu, Shaanxi
Chelonopsis lichiangensis W.W.Sm. - Sichuan, Yunnan
Chelonopsis longipes Makino - Japan
Chelonopsis mollissima C.Y.Wu - Yunnan
Chelonopsis moschata Miq. - Japan
Chelonopsis odontochila Diels - Sichuan, Yunnan
Chelonopsis praecox Weckerle & F.K.Huber - Sichuan
Chelonopsis rosea W.W.Sm. - Yunnan
Chelonopsis siccanea W.W.Sm. - Sichuan, Yunnan
Chelonopsis souliei (Bonati) Merr. - Yunnan, Tibet
Chelonopsis yagiharana Hisauti & Matsuno - Honshu

References

Lamiaceae
Lamiaceae genera